, also known as  was Empress consort of Japan. She was the consort of Emperor Go-Toba.

She was the daughter of regent Kujō Kanezane.

Upon the death of her mother in 1201, she undertook the Buddhist precepts under the monk Hōnen. 

Issue

 Imperial Princess Shōshi (昇子内親王) (1195–1211) - unmarried Empress as adopted mother of Emperor Juntoku (Shunkamon-in, 春華門院)

Notes

Fujiwara clan
Japanese empresses
1173 births
1239 deaths
Emperor Go-Toba
Pure Land Buddhists
Japanese Buddhists
13th-century Buddhists
Buddhism and women